Aleksander Miller (Müller, Aleksandr Aleksandrovich Miller (1862, Saint Petersburg – 1923, Baden-Baden) was a Russian nobleman, the last Russian President of Warsaw.

Graduate of St. Petersburg University. Owned and managed estate near Ariogala, being a neighbour and friend of Pyotr Stolypin. From 1902 to 1909 he was elected Marshal of Nobility of the Kovno Governorate.

Miller was President of Warsaw from 1909 to 1915, up to the moment when the city was occupied by the German army during the World War I.

1862 births
1923 deaths
Saint Petersburg State University alumni
Marshals of nobility
Mayors of Warsaw
Government officials of Congress Poland
Russian nobility